Nordic Combined at the 2013 Winter Universiade was held at the Trampolino dal Ben in Predazzo at Stadio del Fondo di Lago di Tesero in Tesero from December 13 to December 18, 2013.

Events

Medals table

External links
Results
Result Book – Nordic Combined

2013 in Nordic combined
2013 Winter Universiade
2013
Nordic combined competitions in Italy